Lucknow is an unincorporated community in Susquehanna Township, Dauphin County, Pennsylvania, United States, in the Harrisburg-Carlisle area.Linglestown Road passes through the heart of the community.

Lucknow is roughly bounded to the north by Rockville and Blue Ridge Road in upper Susquehanna Township; Lucknow Road to the south, southeast to the Harrisburg city line, then northwest along Linglestown Road to Fargreen Road to the east. 

The official PennDOT township map has its location marked at the intersection of Lucknow Road and North Sixth Street. While the USGS coordinates dispute its location to the north of Pennsylvania Route 39 and east of the 22/322 interchange.

References

Harrisburg–Carlisle metropolitan statistical area
Unincorporated communities in Dauphin County, Pennsylvania
Unincorporated communities in Pennsylvania